Cage Fury Fighting Championships (CFFC) is an American mixed martial arts (MMA) promotion primarily operating in the Northeastern United States. Founded by Felix and Amy Martinez, they promoted their first shows in Atlantic City, New Jersey, launching the careers of fighters such as Kimbo Slice. The last-minute cancellation of its sixth event under the ownership of Felix and Amy Martinez in 2007 signaled its temporary demise; however, it resurfaced nearly four years later when Vineland, New Jersey native Robert Haydak Jr. purchased the organization and began promoting shows. Since then Haydak has re-invented the CFFC brand, bringing it to be considered one of the top regional MMA promotions in the United States.

CFFC launched the careers of several Ultimate Fighting Championship (UFC) fighters such as Aljamain Sterling, Paul Felder, George Sullivan and Jimmie Rivera among others. They also played host to a number of other fighters who have appeared on the UFC roster such as Carmelo Marrero, Jim and Dan Miller, Nick Catone, Lyman Good, and Zach Makovsky.

Current champions

Cage Fury Fighting Championships Title History

Cage Fury Heavyweight Championship
Weight limit:

Cage Fury Light Heavyweight Championship
Weight limit:

Cage Fury Middleweight Championship
Weight limit:

Cage Fury Welterweight Championship
Weight limit:

Cage Fury Lightweight Championship
Weight limit:

Cage Fury Featherweight Championship
Weight limit:

Cage Fury Bantamweight Championship
Weight limit:

Cage Fury Flyweight Championship
Weight limit:

Cage Fury Woman’s Bantamweight Championship
Weight limit:

Cage Fury Woman’s Flyweight Championship
Weight limit:

Cage Fury Woman’s Strawweight Championship
Weight limit:

List of events

References

External links
 Official Website
 Cage Fury Facebook page
 Cage Fury Instagram page
 Cage Fury YouTube page

2007 in mixed martial arts
Mixed martial arts organizations
Mixed martial arts broadcasters
Mixed martial arts television shows
Mixed martial arts in the United States